Eraldo Correia Ribeiro (born January 19, 1956), is a former Brazilian professional football player and currently manager. Who last managed Cacahuatique in the second division

Coaching career 
After retiring as a footballer, Correia undertook a new career as a coach, starting in teams such as Aspirante, Fuerte San Francisco and Liberal. During that time he formed his ideas that later led him to train teams of the Salvadoran Primera División.

Once Lobos 
In 2006, he signed as coach of Once Lobos.

Águila reserves 
In 2007, he took the charge of the reserve team of Águila.

Águila 
But after the departure of Pablo Centrone in April 2009, Correia went on to train the first team until November, in what was his first stage in the team. Later, Correia was replaced by Nelson Mauricio Ancheta.

UES 
Correia signed as coach of UES for the rest of the Clausura 2011 in March 2011, replacing Edgar Henríquez. The scarlet team finished eighth in that tournament.

Return to Águila 
In June 2015, Correia was confirmed as new coach of Águila again, replacing Julio Dely Valdés. Later Correia was replaced by Juan Ramón Sánchez.

Sonsonate 
In 2017, Correia was confirmed as new coach of Sonsonate for the rest of the Clausura 2017 tournament.

Luis Ángel Firpo 
Also in 2017, and after finishing his contractual relationship with Sonsonate, he was confirmed as new manager of Luis Ángel Firpo for the Clausura 2018. However, with the team of Usulután, Correia faced an administrative, economic and sports crisis. Suffering arrears in salary payments and pressures from club directives.

Pasaquina 
Correia signed as new coach of Pasaquina for the Apertura 2018. With the team of La Unión, Correia suffered arrears in salary payments.

Honours

Club 
C.D. Águila
 Primera División
 Runners-up:  Apertura 2009

References 

Living people
1956 births
Sportspeople from Pernambuco
Brazilian footballers
Sport Club do Recife players
Olaria Atlético Clube players
C.D. FAS footballers
C.D. Luis Ángel Firpo footballers
Brazilian expatriate footballers
Expatriate footballers in El Salvador
Brazilian football managers
C.D. Águila managers
Municipal Limeño managers
Expatriate football managers in El Salvador
Association footballers not categorized by position